The Florida Bar is the integrated bar association for the state of Florida. It is the third largest such bar in the United States. Its duties include the regulation and discipline of attorneys. The Florida Bar is also responsible for the governing of Florida Registered Paralegals.

As elsewhere in the United States, persons seeking admission to the bar must pass a moral character screening, in this case administered by the Florida Board of Bar Examiners. Admission to the Bar includes passing a background investigation, the Multistate Professional Responsibility Examination, and the bar exam, which tests both the common law through the Multistate Bar Examination and Florida law through written state essays and state-specific multiple-choice questions.   

The Florida Bar's headquarters building and annex are located in Tallahassee, three blocks from the Florida State Capitol.

History
In 1889 the first, small, voluntary group of lawyers formed in Florida. This developed into the Florida State Bar Association in 1907. This remained a voluntary organization, publishing a legal journal, drafting court procedures, and presenting occasional educational courses for lawyers. Its membership never exceeded a few thousand.

With a sharp increase in the number of lawyers after World War I came interest in requiring lawyers to join the Florida State Bar Association, both as a means of improving communication within the profession and of disciplining unethical lawyers. However, the Florida Supreme Court declined to order this until 1949.

In April 1950, the Florida State Bar Association met for the last time. The name was shortened to "The Florida Bar" and the state's 3,758 lawyers automatically became members. Its first president was Richard H. Hunt of Miami.

In 1989, The Florida Bar went to the U.S. Supreme Court to defend restrictions on attorney advertising. The court found in favor of the narrowly tailored rules in Florida Bar v. Went For It, Inc..

References

External links
The Florida Bar
The Florida Board of Bar Examiners
Tips on Preparing for the Florida Bar Exam
Florida Bar Exam Information and Study Materials

1907 establishments in Florida
American state bar associations
Bar
Organizations established in 1907